Al-Abnāʾ was a term that was used in pre-Islamic and early Islamic Yemen to refer to the descendants of Iranian soldiers who had intermarried with local Arab women in southern Arabia after its conquest by the Sasanian Iranian Empire. Sasanian Iranian troops were garrisoned in Sanaʽa and its surrounding regions following the Sasanian Iranian reconquest of Yemen from the Aksumite Ethiopian Empire in the 570s CE. Their leaders largely converted to Islam following the rise of Muhammad and were active in the early Muslim conflicts.

Etymology 

According to a commentary on a poem Kitab al-Aghani by the 10th-century Arab historian Abu al-Faraj al-Isfahani, these people were up until this time referred to as banū al-aḥrār in Sanaʽa and as al-abnāʾ in the rest of Yemen. The names were defined as such due to a narration that told of a strong storm that hit ancient Yemen and revealed a stone inscription that stated, "Who rules Dhamar? Himyar the Good. Who rules Dhamar? The evil Abyssinians. Who rules Dhamar? The free Persians." A similar stone inscription was said to have been found underneath the Kaaba in pre-Islamic times.

History

The known history of the Al-Abnāʾ people covers their time between the Aksumite–Persian wars in the 6th century and the rise of Islam in the 7th century. It is unknown whether the community had maintained the practices of Zoroastrianism from Iran, or if they had been influenced by South Arabian paganism and local Christianity. The 9th/10th-century Muslim scholar al-Tabari states that Khurrah Khosraw, the fourth Sasanian governor of Yemen, was replaced by the governor Badhan during the reign of Khosrow II due to the former's excessive assimilation with the local Arab society.

The authority of the Sasanian governors of Yemen was reduced during the Byzantine–Sasanian War of 602–628; this conflict had coincided with the rise of Islam. The Sasanian leaders in Yemen, including Badhan, Fayruz al-Daylami and Wahb ibn Munabbih, responded favourably to the diplomatic missions sent by Muhammad, and had formally converted to Islam by 631. Following Badhan's death, his son Shahr replaced him as governor but was killed by the rebellious Al-Aswad Al-Ansi, who had claimed prophethood during the Ridda wars. Al-Aswad was later killed by Fayruz, who assumed his position as governor of Yemen. After that, Ghayth ibn Abd Yaghuth rebels, this time against al-abna' themselves, seeking their expulsion from the Arabian Peninsula. Dādawayh, an al-abna' leader, was killed, while Fayruz al-Daylami and Jushnas (Gushnasp) managed to flee with their allies, and later defeated Ghayth ibn Abd Yaghuth. Fayruz al-Daylami and the abna' were later active in the fertile crescent and Yemen under Caliph Umar during the Second Ridda War.

The abna' retained their distinct identity during the Islamic period. Their nisba was al-Abnāwī. These people were gradually absorbed into the local population and thus disappeared from records. Descendants of al-Abna' live in the al-Furs village in Wadi Rijam, al-Abna' village in Wadi al-Sir in Bani Hushish District and in Khulan al-Tyal, Bayt Baws and Bani Bahlul.

This title "al-abna'" may have been the root of the title "al-abna'" used to refer to the influential Persians of Baghdad in Abbasid period. The "abna'" recorded in some conflicts among Arabs of Khorasan in Umayyad period is not related to the abna' of Yemen.

See also
Kisra legend

References

Sources 
 
 
 
 

History of Yemen
7th-century Islam
7th century in Yemen
Islamic history of Yemen
History of Sanaa
Military history of Yemen
Arabization
People from the Sasanian Empire
Military history of the Sasanian Empire
Yemeni people of Iranian descent
People from Sanaa
Iran–Yemen relations
Women in pre-Islamic Arabia